Ion Ganea (born 10 February 1945) is a Romanian diver. He competed in two events at the 1972 Summer Olympics.

References

1945 births
Living people
Romanian male divers
Olympic divers of Romania
Divers at the 1972 Summer Olympics
Sportspeople from Sibiu